Benjamin Conquest (3 December 1803 - 12 July 1872), born Benjamin Oliver, was the manager of the Garrick and Grecian Theatres.

Early life and family
Conquest was born Benjamin Oliver 3 December 1803 and Baptised 8 January 1804 

Conquest's son was the playwright and manager George Augustus Conquest (1837-1901). George had three sons who were also active in the theatre, George Conquest (1858-1926), Fred Conquest (1871-1941) and Arthur Conquest (1875-1945).

Career

Conquest was the manager of the Garrick Theatre in Leman Street, London. Following the retirement of Thomas Rouse in 1851, he became the proprietor of the Grecian Theatre and Eagle Tavern in the City Road, Hackney, London. The theatre had previously produced light opera and was originally a music hall, but Conquest switched to Shakespeare which was unsuccessful. He then tried melodrama which was more popular and he produced over 100 such shows written by his son George, often adapted from French productions. George was also an acrobat and pantomimist and produced nearly 50 pantomimes in collaboration with Henry Spry. The theatre was rebuilt in 1858.

Death
Conquest died at his home in the New North Road, London, on 12 July 1872, aged 68. He is buried at Kensal Green Cemetery in London. George Augustus Conquest inherited the Grecian Theatre.

References 

1800s births
Year of birth uncertain
1872 deaths
Burials at Kensal Green Cemetery
British theatre managers and producers
19th-century British businesspeople